Adelina Chilica is an Angolan politician for the MPLA and a member of the National Assembly of Angola.

References 

Year of birth missing (living people)
Living people
MPLA politicians
Members of the National Assembly (Angola)
21st-century Angolan women politicians
21st-century Angolan politicians